Sergey Aleksandrovich Fursenko (born 1954 in Leningrad, Soviet Union) is a Russian  businessman.

He is a brother of Andrei Fursenko.

Career
Since the early 1990s, Fursenko has owned a dacha in Solovyovka, Priozersky District of the Leningrad region, on the eastern shore of Lake Komsomolskoye on the Karelian Isthmus near St. Petersburg. His neighbours there are Vladimir Putin, Vladimir Yakunin, his brother Andrei Fursenko, Yuriy Kovalchuk, Viktor Myachin, Vladimir Smirnov and Nikolay Shamalov. On 10 November 1996, together they instituted the co-operative society Ozero (the Lake) which united their properties.

Since July 2003, Fursenko has been the director general of the JSC Lentransgaz, a subsidiary of Gazprom. 

Since 2005, he has been the director general (later president) of the football club Zenit, Saint Petersburg. 

From February 2010 until June 2012, he was the president of the Russian Football Union.

In April 2018, the United States imposed sanctions on him and 23 other Russian nationals.

References

External links 
 Biography (in Russian)

Businesspeople from Saint Petersburg
1954 births
Living people
Russian people of Ukrainian descent
Russian football chairmen and investors
FC Zenit Saint Petersburg
Russian individuals subject to the U.S. Department of the Treasury sanctions
Presidents of the Russian Football Union
Russian energy industry businesspeople